Nipishish Lake is a lake in central Labrador, Canada.

Labrador
Lakes of Newfoundland and Labrador